is a railroad company based in Kyoto Prefecture, Japan (but with offices in Fukui Prefecture) in operation since March 2, 1942. It is a parent company of Keifuku Bus and  Kyoto Bus, and an affiliated company of Keihan Electric Railway, which owns 42.89% of the company stock. The company's stock is traded on the second section of the Tokyo Stock Exchange.

Lines 
It was transferred to the Kyoto-based electric power generation company . Later it built the Kitano Line.

Formerly the company operated several railway lines in Fukui Prefecture. Some of them are now operated by Echizen Railway.

The Eizan Electric Railway also belonged to Keifuku until 1985.

Randen 
The  is a small network of interurban lines classified legally as tramways in Kyoto.

Arashiyama Line 

The  connects Kyoto's city center (Shijo-Omiya terminal) and scenic Arashiyama area in the western suburb.

Kitano Line 

The  is from Kitano Hakubaicho Station near Kitano Tenmangū to Katabiranotsuji Station in the midst of Arashiyama (Main) Line.

Eizan Cable 

Eizan Ropeway 
The  (Ja) is an aerial tramway in Sakyo-ku, Kyoto.

The cable and ropeway lines are for visitors to Mount Hiei on the northeastern edge of the city, together with Eizan Electric Railway's Eizan Main Line.

History

Arashiyama Line
The Arashiyama Tram opened the line in 1910, with 1,435 mm gauge and electrified at 600 V DC. The Kyoto Electric Light Company acquired the line in 1918, and double-tracked the track between 1925 and 1928. Keifuku acquired the line in 1942.

Kitano Line
The Kyoto Electric Light Company opened the line between 1925 and 1926, and double-tracked the Tokiwa to Narutaki section in 1930. Plans to double-track the rest of the line were abandoned as a result of the economic depression. Keifuku acquired the line in 1942.

Former connecting lines
 Arashiyama Station: A 3 km 1,435 mm gauge line electrified at 600 V DC and dual track except for the Kiyotaki tunnel operated to Kiyotaki between 1929 and 1944. It connected to a 2 km 1,067 mm gauge funicular which climbed 638 m to Atago Jinja on Mount Atago, Kosaku line which operated for the same period. Closed due to war time austerity measures, efforts to re-establish the incline in the 1950s were unsuccessful.

Etymology
"Keifuku" is composed of two characters "京" and "福", the former denoting Kyoto and the latter Fukui. As the Kyoto Dento lines used to be in Fukui, the hydraulic source, and in Kyoto, the company took the name "Keifuku".

See also
 List of railway lines in Japan

References
This article incorporates material from the corresponding article in the Japanese Wikipedia

External links

 Randen
 Keifuku Electric Railroad 

Railway companies established in 1942
Rail transport in Kyoto Prefecture
Railway companies of Japan
Companies based in Kyoto
Railway lines opened in 1910
Tram transport in Japan
Standard gauge railways in Japan
Gondola lifts in Japan
Companies listed on the Tokyo Stock Exchange
Japanese companies established in 1942
600 V DC railway electrification